Domkal Girls' College, established in 2011, is a general degree women's college in  Domkal, Murshidabad district. It offers undergraduate courses in arts. It is affiliated to  University of Kalyani.

Departments

Arts
Bengali
English
History
Education
Political Science
Sociology
Philosophy
Geography
Physical Education

See also

References

External links
Domkal Girls' College
University of Kalyani
University Grants Commission
National Assessment and Accreditation Council

Universities and colleges in Murshidabad district
Colleges affiliated to University of Kalyani
Educational institutions established in 2011
2011 establishments in West Bengal